Recyclebank  is a company based in New York City that promotes recycling and environmental awareness. It provides a rewards program for various goods. A Certified B Corporation, Recyclebank is headquartered in New York City.

History

In 2001, New York City was considering cancelling its recycling program. Then Fordham Law student Patrick FitzGerald drafted a business model to financially incentivize people to recycle and allow businesses to promote sustainability. In 2003, he contacted Ron Gonen, a high school friend, for assistance. By 2003, the two had completed a business plan, and by 2004, began a pilot program in Philadelphia. In 2009, Recyclebank became a certified B corporation.

See also
Efficient energy use
Gamification
Sustainability
Triple Bottom Line
Waste Management

References

External links
Official Site for RecycleBank

Companies based in New York City
Gamification
Recycling in New York City